The 2023 Niger State gubernatorial election will take place on 18 March 2023, to elect the Governor of Niger State, concurrent with elections to the Niger State House of Assembly as well as twenty-seven other gubernatorial elections and elections to all other state houses of assembly. The election—which was postponed from its original 11 March date—will be held three weeks after the presidential election and National Assembly elections. Incumbent APC Governor Abubakar Sani Bello is term-limited and cannot seek re-election to a third term.

Party primaries were scheduled for between 4 April and 9 June 2022 with the All Progressives Congress nominating Mohammed Umar Bago—House of Representatives member for Chanchaga—on 26 May while the Peoples Democratic Party nominated former commissioner Isah Liman Kantigi on the same day after its primary was postponed by 24 hours.

Electoral system
The governor of Niger State is elected using a modified two-round system. To be elected in the first round, a candidate must receive the plurality of the vote and over 25% of the vote in at least two-thirds of state local government areas. If no candidate passes this threshold, a second round will be held between the top candidate and the next candidate to have received a plurality of votes in the highest number of local government areas.

Background
Niger State is a large, diverse state in the North Central with agricultural and energy potential but facing a debilitated health sector and intense challenges in security as the nationwide kidnapping epidemic, bandit conflict, and herder–farmer clashes have all heavily affected the state with added fears of ISWAP encroachment.

Politically, the state's 2019 elections were a solidification of the control of the state APC. In federal elections, Buhari retained the state presidentially while the APC swept all three senate seats and ten House of Representatives seats. On the state level, the party also held the governorship and kept the majority in the House of Assembly.

Ahead of his second term, Bello pledged to focus on education, increasing agricultural production, affordable housing, and improving access to clean drinking water. In terms of his performance, Bello was praised for expanding the energy sector but was criticized for failing to combat rising insecurity, poor road infrastructure, a failure to pay teacher salaries and the ensuing educator strike, having a political opponent imprisoned, and his role in the March 2022 APC leadership crisis.

Primary elections
The primaries, along with any potential challenges to primary results, were to take place between 4 April and 3 June 2022 but the deadline was extended to 9 June. An informal zoning gentlemen's agreement sets the Niger South Senatorial District to produce the next governor as someone from Niger South has not held the governorship since 2007. While only the PDP has closed their primaries to non-Southern candidates, nearly all potential candidates are from the South and it appears as if both major parties are holding to the zoning agreement.

All Progressives Congress 

In the days before the primary, controversy arose over the alleged manipulation of the delegate list for the primary. By the primary date, the exercise was peacefully held in Minna and resulted in a 15% margin of victory for Mohammed Umar Bago, a House of Representatives member. In his acceptance speech, Bago thanked delegates while noting that the primary was only the beginning of the campaign. On 4 July, the state APC announced Yakubu Garba—the state NLC chairman—as Bago's running mate in a press release.

Nominated 
 Mohammed Umar Bago: House of Representatives member for Chanchaga (2011–present)
Running mate—Yakubu Garba: Chairman of the Niger State Nigeria Labour Congress

Eliminated in primary 
 Abubakar Garba Ibrahim Dodo: engineer
 Mohammed Idris Malagi: publisher of Blueprint
 Ahmed Muhammad Ketso: Deputy Governor (2015–present)
 Mohammed Kpoutagi
 Yahaya Kuta: former Secretary to the State Government
 Muhammed Nda: teacher and lecturer
 Sani Ndanusa: former Minister of Youths, Sports and Social Development (2008–2010)
 Engr Muhammad Rufai: former Director (North-East zone), Federal Ministry of Works and Housing
 Aliyu Idris Rugga
 Idris Usman Makanta: farmer

Declined 
 Abubakar Lado Abdullahi: House of Representatives member for Gurara/Suleja/Tafa (2015–present) and former House of Assembly member (2011–2015)
 Zakari Abubakar: Commissioner of Finance
 Muhammadu Bala Faruk: former House of Representatives member for Bida/Gbako/Katcha (2015–2019)
 Muhammad Bima Enagi: Senator for Niger South (2019–present)
 Isah Kawu: 2019 ADP gubernatorial nominee, former House of Assembly member, and former Speaker of the House of Assembly (2012)
 Ibrahim Bako Shettima: member of the Revenue Mobilization Allocation and Fiscal Commission Board

Results

People's Democratic Party 
In June 2020, Niger PDP then-Caretaker Committee Chairman Garba Umaru announced that the party had zoned their gubernatorial nomination to Niger South Senatorial District as a part of an internal party deal to cede the deputy gubernatorial slot to Niger East Senatorial District while Niger South would hold the party chairmanship until handing over to Niger North. Zoning the PDP nomination to Niger South was reaffirmed in February 2022 by now-state party chairman Tanko Beji and other state party leaders. By April 2022, the state party leadership also intended to use the consensus method for the nomination with a meeting resulting in Isah Liman Kantigi's emergence as the intended nominee but the plan fell through when some rival candidates rejected the arrangement and bought forms anyway.

On the primary date, four of the five candidates lead protests against the alleged manipulation of the delegate list in favour of Kantigi. The protests forced primary committee chairman Lawrence Ewhrudjakpo to postpone the primary until the next day. On 26 May, the five candidates finally contested the indirect primary that ended with Kantigi emerging as the PDP nominee after results showed him winning over 80% of delegates' votes. A few weeks later, Samuel Gomna was picked as the deputy gubernatorial nominee; it was noted that Gomna was a Christian making the ticket the first religiously diverse PDP ticket since 2007. In November, a lawsuit from Mohammed Sani Idris Legbo Kutigi that challenged the primary results was dismissed.

Nominated 
 Isah Liman Kantigi: 2015 PDP deputy gubernatorial nominee and former Commissioner for Local Government, Chieftaincy Affairs and Community Development
Running mate—Samuel Gomna

Eliminated in primary 
 Sidi Abdul
 Abdulrahman Hassan Gimba: former Minister of Sport (2011–2015)
 Abdullahi Isah Jankara: engineer
 Mohammed Sani Idris Legbo Kutigi: 2015 and 2019 PDP gubernatorial nominee, former House of Representatives member for Lavun/Mokwa/Edati (2011–2015), and son of former Supreme Court Chief Justice Idris Legbo Kutigi

Withdrew 
 Idris Ndako Kpaki: former Secretary to the State Government, former House of Assembly member, and former Speaker of the House of Assembly

Results

Minor parties 

 Salaudeen Abdulazeez Oyeniyi (Accord)
Running mate: Yusuf Ibrahim
 Mohammed Idris (Action Alliance)
Running mate: Muhammad Tukur Muhammad
 Saidu Abdulmalik (Action Democratic Party)
Running mate: Angela Bala
 Mohammed Bello Isah (Action Peoples Party)
Running mate: Abdulrahman Mustapha
 Yahaya Dan'Baba Dauda (African Democratic Congress)
Running mate: Jacob Adams
 Aliyu Muhammad (Allied Peoples Movement)
Running mate: Audu Mohammed
 Khadija Abdullahi-Iya (All Progressives Grand Alliance)
Running mate: Mohammed Kudu Ndayako
 Joshua Nuhu Bawa (Labour Party)
Running mate: Ibrahim Alhassan
 Yahaya Ibrahim Mohammed (New Nigeria Peoples Party)
Running mate: John Paul Bahago
 Ibrahim Abubakar (National Rescue Movement)
Running mate: Emmanuel Baba Pada
 Abdulkadir Lawu Bahari (People's Redemption Party)
Running mate: Badaru Adamu Yunusa
 Bukhari Yakubu Yarima (Social Democratic Party)
Running mate: Rakiya Umar
 Umar Larat Aliyu (Young Progressives Party)
Running mate: Zakariyya Muhammad Adam

Campaign
After the primaries, the major party nominees—mostly Bago (APC)—spent months attempting to reconcile with aggrieved members of their own parties. Bago went on a reconciliatory tour around the state to meet party members; these APC reconciliation attempts occurred all while the PDP conversely tried to woo aggrieved APC members into the party. Analysts questioned the effectiveness of Bago's tour, especially amid other disputes within the state APC. In early 2023, campaign analysis focused on the divides between urban-rural electorates with reports stating that Bago led in his native city of Minna while Kantigi led in Nupe-majority rural communities of the state's south. But the campaign was derailed by controversy in mid-February, when a video surfaced showing Kantigi issuing death threats against voters who planned to take his bribes but not eventually vote for him. Later in February, attention largely switched to the presidential election on 25 February. In the election, Niger State voted for Bola Tinubu (APC); Tinubu won 48.2% of the vote, beating the 36.6% of Atiku Abubakar (PDP) and the 10.3% of Peter Obi (LP). In the wake of the result, the EiE-SBM forecast projected Bago to win.

Projections

Conduct

Electoral timetable

Pre-election
Due to widespread insecurity in the state, civil society groups raised concern about the safe conduct of the election in heavily-insecure areas.

General election

By senatorial district 
The results of the election by senatorial district.

By federal constituency
The results of the election by federal constituency.

By local government area 
The results of the election by local government area.

See also 
 2023 Nigerian elections
 2023 Nigerian gubernatorial elections

Notes

References 

Niger State gubernatorial election
2023
2023 Niger State elections
Niger